Pałac Bydgoszcz is a Polish women's volleyball club based in Bydgoszcz and plays in the Tauron Liga.

Previous names
Due to sponsorship, the club have competed under the following names:
 Pałac Bydgoszcz (1982–1993)
 Gryf Bydgoszcz (1993–1994)
 Gryf Pałac Bydgoszcz (1994–1995)
 Pałac Centrostal Bydgoszcz (1995–1998)
 Centrostal Eltra Bydgoszcz (1998–1999)
 Centrostal AMT Bydgoszcz (1999–2000)
 Bank Pocztowy Centrostal Bydgoszcz (2000–2002)
 Bank Pocztowy GCB Adriana Gazeta Pomorska Bydgoszcz (2002–2003)
 GCB Adriana Gazeta Pomorska Bydgoszcz (2003–2004)
 Centrostal Adriana Gazeta Pomorska Bydgoszcz (2004–2005)
 Centrostal Focus Park Bydgoszcz (2005–2007)
 GCB Centrostal Bydgoszcz (2007–2011)
 Pałac Bydgoszcz (2011–present)

History
The club was created in 1982 at the Pałac Młodzieży (Palace of the Youth) in Bydgoszcz and was named . It has various youth teams and a senior team competing in the Polish national leagues. The senior team is playing in the Polish highest league since the 1992–93 season. The team (playing in the past under various names due to sponsorship reasons) has finished amongst the top three of the highest league, including once champions, for five times. The club is also noted for its very good work with the youth, carrying on practices for all youth-age player groups, starting from the youngest. Among other honours its junior team has won the national junior competitions championship for three times (recently in the 2009–10 season). Several players of the Polish national team (senior, academic and junior) have played or are currently playing in the club teams, several of them have been or are the club wards.

Honours

National competitions
  Polish Championship: 1
1992–93

  Polish Cup: 3
1991–92, 2000–01, 2004–05

  Polish Super Cup: 1
2005

Team
Season 2016–2017, as of February 2017.

References

External links

 Official website 

Volleyball clubs established in 1982
1982 establishments in Poland
Women's volleyball teams in Poland
Sport in Bydgoszcz